The Tea-garden community are multi ethnic groups of tea garden workers and their descendants in Assam. They are officially referred to as Tea-tribes by Government of Assam. They are the descendants of peoples brought by the British colonial planters as indentured labourers from the regions of present-day Jharkhand, Odisha,  Chhattisgarh, West Bengal and Andhra Pradesh into colonial Assam during 1860-90s in multiple phases to work in tea gardens. They are heterogeneous, multi-ethnic groups which includes many tribal and caste groups. They are found mainly in those districts of Upper Assam and Northern Brahmaputra belt where there is high concentration of tea gardens like Kokrajhar, Udalguri, Sonitpur, Biswanath,Nagaon, Golaghat, Jorhat, Sivasagar, Charaideo, Dibrugarh, Tinsukia, Lakhimpur. There is a sizeable population of the community in the Barak Valley region of Assam as well in the districts of Cachar, Karimganj and Hailakandi. The total population is estimated to be around 7 million of which estimated 4.5 million reside in residential quarters built inside 799 tea estates spread across tea growing regions of Assam. Another 2.5 million reside in the nearby villages spread across those tea growing regions. They are not a single ethnic group but consists of different ethnic group speaking dozens of languages and have different set of cultures. They speak several languages including Sora, Odia, Assam Sadri, Sambalpuri, Kurmali, Santali, Kurukh, Kharia, Kui, Chhattisgarhi, Gondi and Mundari. Assam Sadri, distinguished from Sadri language, serve as lingua franca among the community.

A sizeable section of the community, particularly those having Scheduled tribe status in other states of India and living mainly in the village areas other than tea gardens, prefers to call themselves "Adivasi" and are known by the term Adivasi in Assam, whereas the Scheduled Tribes of Assam are known as Tribe. Many tea garden community members are tribals like Munda, Santhal, Kurukh, Gonds, and Bhumij. They have been demanding Schedule Tribe status in Assam but the tribal organization of Assam are against it, which has resulted in several clashes between them and deaths.

History

Immigration into Assam
In the 19th century, British find Assam suitable for Tea cultivation. British wanted to increase their revenue by tea plantation. British needed labourers to make tea garden, So they brought labourers from different parts of country to clear the forest tracts and make tea gardens. Thus these labourers clear large tracts of forest  and made tea gardens. Tea garden workers were brought to the tea plantations of Assam in several phases from the mid-nineteenth century to the mid-twentieth century from the tribal heartland of central-eastern India as indentured labourers. During the 1840s, tribal people throughout the Chota Nagpur Division were revolting against expanding British control, and the scarcity of cheap labour to work in the expanding tea industry of Assam led the British authorities to recruit primarily Tribals and some backward-class Hindus as indentured labourers to work in Assam's tea gardens. Thousands of those people recruited as labourers died of diseases during the journey to Assam, and hundreds who tried to flee were killed by the British authorities as the punishment of breaching their contracts.

In 1841 the first attempt was made by the Assam Company to recruit labourers. In this attempt, 652 people were forcibly recruited but due to an outbreak of cholera, most of them died. Those who survived fled. In 1859 the Workmen's Breach of Contract Act was passed, which instituted harsh penalties for indentured labourers who broke their contracts, including flogging. It alleviated the scarcity of labourers on the plantation by recruiting from outside Assam through contracts. 'Arakattis' or brokers were appointed to recruit labour from outside the area. In 1870 the "Sardari System" was introduced to recruit labourers.

Conditions of recruitment of labour from Bengal and Bihar were inhuman. 'Arakattis' resorted to several fraudulent practices and physical force. From 15 December 1859 to 21 November 1861, the Assam Company brought the first batch of 2,272 recruits from outside. Out of 2,272 recruits, 250 died on the way to Assam. From 2 April 1861 to 25 February 1862, 2,569 people were recruited and sent to Assam in two batches, via the Brahmaputra river route. During the journey 135 died and 103 absconded. Between 1 May 1863 and 1 May 1866, 84,915 labourers were recruited, but 30,000 had died by June 1866. From 1877 to 1929, 419,841 recruits entered Assam as indentured labourers, including 162,188 males, 119,582 females and 138,071 children. From 1938 to 1947, 158,706 recruits came to Assam. They were brought to Assam through three riverine routes, two along the Brahmaputra and one via the Surma. 
Debarken Depots were used to carry the bonded labours. Some of the Debarken Depots in the Brahmaputra were Tezpur, Silghat, Kokilamukh, Dibrugarh, etc. Debarken Depots in Surma (Barak) were Silchar, Katigorah, Karimganj etc. 
Labourers were brought in ships, in conditions that were far lower than required for the transport of animals. Steamers were overcrowded with recruits and it was highly unhygienic. These conditions led to the spread of cholera among the labourers which led to the death of many among them in the journey.

Under the colonial rule of British

After the journey, their life in the tea gardens was also difficult. Planters made barracks known as the Coolie line for the labourers and these were overcrowded. "Coolie" was a term used by Tea garden authorities to denote labourers, and is now considered to be a derogatory term by the community. 
In these barracks, each tea garden labourer had barely twenty-five square feet of area for their personal use. Many of the tea gardens insisted on a morning muster of the labours. They were not allowed to remain absent in their duty for a single day even when they were unwell. The labourers did not enjoy any personal freedom at all, and were even forbidden to meet labourers working at other tea gardens. Prior permission from the manager of the tea gardens was necessary for the marriage of the labourers.
In addition to emigrant labourers, tea planters also forced labourers to increase the birth rate, so that each garden could garner enough labour force. Abortion was strictly prohibited.

The wages paid to labourers were very low. This forced the whole of family members to work in the tea garden. From 1865–1881 men labourers were paid only ₹5 per month and women ₹4 per month. The situation remained the same up to 1900. It was only by an Act of 1901 that wages increased to ₹5.5 for men, and ₹4.5 for women.  Children's wages remained the same. These rates of pay compared extremely unfavourably with other manual work available: in the early 1880s an unskilled railway construction labourer earned ₹12 to 16 per month (3 times more than tea garden labour).

The tea garden labourers suffered under legal bondage. Their lives were governed by the Workmen's Breach of Contract Act (Act 3 of 1859). Under this act employees were liable to prosecution, and even imprisonment, for breach of contract. Inertia, refusal to work and desertion were likewise punishable offenses for which the workers could be flogged, subjected to physical torture and imprisoned under the provisions of this act. Flogging was common practice in the tea gardens. The then Chief Commissioner Assam Fuller commented on the condition of labourers, "...They were deprived of all their freedom and their derogatory conditions and atrocities remind one of the slaves running in Africa and the global slave trade."

In addition to this, the tea garden manager might abuse the workers physically. A tea garden manager in Darrang district caught a boy, in his attempt of burglary, and he was beaten to death. His dead body was subsequently found with marks which showed that he had been cruelly beaten. In Cachar district, a boy was flogged to death because he did not salute the European manager. The most notorious incident was a shooting in which a tea garden labourer was killed by the European planter of the Kharial Tea Estate of Cachar in 1921, after refusing to provide his daughter as a concubine to the planter for a night. Facing such atrocities many tea garden labourers often become insane. Many such sufferers were confined in the jail set up at Tezpur, in 1876, for insane people.

Health conditions during colonial times
Thousands of labourers died annually due to the non-availability of health care as the medical system was very poor in the tea gardens of Assam. The gardens did not appoint any doctors. Though Colonial Government tried to make tea gardens appoint European Medical officers, and send Health report to the Government regularly, tea gardens failed to comply. Most of the gardens didn't have hospitals to treat ill health labourers. Most of the gardens appointed some trained physicians called LMP (Learned Medical Practitioner) doctor only after 1889, when Berry White Medical School was set up at Barbari, Dibrugarh.

State of Education during colonial rule
Regarding schooling in the tea garden areas a report was published by a European DPI in 1917–18 that as many as 2 lakh children of school going age were there lie in the tea gardens of Assam but not even 2% were turned up for primary education. The numbers of the schools and students enrolment were in papers and files only. It is quite clear from the fact that in 1950 there were 5,00,416 numbers of children who could attend the lower Primary schools but there were only 29,361 children attended the primary schools. It was just meagre 6%. During the period 1946–50, there were only four college students from tea gardens. The number of students attended high schools, included M. E. schools, during this period was, Jorhat – 29, Dibrugarh – 15, Golaghat – 22, Titabor – 04, Nagaon – 10, Lakhimpur – 12, Tezpur – 41 and Mangaldai – 05.

The tea planters never encouraged education to garden labourers as it would prevent them from physical labor or may encourage protest against exploitation. Even after Indian independence, the amount spent on tea garden education in the first five-year plan was just 0.26 million (2.6 lakhs) i.e. not even ten paise per tea garden labourer.

The medium of instruction had also created problems in the tea gardens. Different tribes and castes had their own language and literature in the school owing largely to their original places. In tea gardens, three languages were primarily spoken by the labours, viz. Santhali, Kurukh, Mundari. But commonly "Sadri" was used and outside the tea gardens the Assamese language was used as a medium of communication. Therefore, Narayan Ghatowar, a prominent intellectual of the community advocated that Assamese be imparted in the schools only by "Sadri" knowing teachers.

Participation in Indian Independence Movement
Though the community remained oppressed primary as a Plantation labourers, they still had the anti-colonial anti-British attitude alive in their mindset.

Noted Historian Amalendu Guha remarks,"Illiterate, ignorant, unorganised and isolated from their homes as they were, the plantation workers were weak and powerless against the planters". But still several times they tried to protest against the atrocities of the planters and Estate managers. For example, protest of 1884 in Bowalia T.E., Strike of Helem T.E. in 1921, etc.

Number of people from the community actively participated in the Indian Independence movement. Some of the names of the participants are, Gajaram Kurmi, Pratap Gond, Shamburam Gond, Mohanchal Gond, Jagamohan Gond, Bidesh Kamar Lohar, Ansa Bhuyan, Radhu Munda, Gobin Tanti, Ramsai Turi, Bishnu Suku Majhi, Bongai Bauri, Durgi Bhumij, etc. Some of the freedom fighters who became martyrs are Christison Munda, Doyal Das Panika, Mongol Kurku, Tehlu Saora and Bankuru Saora. Christison Munda ignited a revolt across the tea garden regions of Rangapara in 1915 and was publicly hanged at Phulbari T.E (near Rangapara) by colonial authorities in 1916. Malati Mem alias "Mangri" Oraon of Tezpur Ghogara TE (near Tezpur) became the first ever woman martyr of Assam in 1921. She was killed by colonial Police while participating in Non-cooperation movement. The names of these tea garden labourers never got any importance in the histography, but as Guha quoted "it must be admitted that these Adivasis joined in the Indian Independence movement, not because of the Assamese middle class, the Congress or the Assamese non-state organizations, but in spite of them."

Demographics
 
An ethno-linguistic minority, the population of the community is primarily rural in nature and estimated to be around 7 million (70 lakhs) or nearly 20% of Assam's total population.

They live in almost every district of Assam but their density varies according to the number of tea plantations in different regions of Assam. They are more numerous in Upper Assam and Central Assam than Lower Assam. Some were not brought for tea garden labour. Many tribes (most notably Santhal, Kurukh, Bhumij and Munda people) were forcibly displaced by the British from the Chotanagpur region due to their rebellion against the British regime. They were dumped into Lower Assam regions of then undivided Goalpara and undivided Darrang districts as a punishment for their uprising against the regime (Santhal rebellion of the 1850s and Birsa Munda Rebellion of 1899–1900).

The community dominates the districts of significant portion of Upper Assam including Sonitpur due to the high density of tea gardens and plantations in this region. Districts of North Lakhimpur, Darrang, Golaghat district, Charaideo district, Karbi Anglong Autonomous Council (KAAC) areas, Dhubri district, Barak Valley areas, Bodoland Territorial Council (BTC) areas, and North Cachar Hills Autonomous Council (NC Hills) areas of Assam also have a significant population of the community. They form nearly 11% and 6.2% of the total population in the Barak Valley region and BTR region respectively.

Different political parties appeal to them during election seasons in Assam as their demographic numbers always influence politics in Assam.

They are neither a single ethnic tribe nor a single caste but are the people of various ethno-linguistic origins, from different regions of eastern India composed of dozens of tribes and castes. The list of tribes and castes among them are Asur, Aryamala, Baiga, Bania, Banjara, Bedia, Bhumij, Bhuinya, Bhil, Binjhia, Birhor, Basphor, Birijia, Bauri, Bhakta, Beldar, Baraik, Bagti, Bondo, Bhatta, Basor, Chamar, Chero, Chik Baraik, Deswali Goala Bagal, Dhanwar, Dandari, Dhobi, Dushad, Dandasi, Dhandari, Dom,  Gour, Ghansi, Ganda, Gorait, Ghatowar, Gonds, Gossain, Ganjhu, Gowala, Hari, Holra, Julaha, Karmakar, Koiri, Kharia, Kalahandi, Karmali, Karwa, Kol, Kumhar, Kherwar,  Khonds, Khodal, Koya, Kondpan, Kohor, Kishan, Kudumi Mahato, Kewat, Lodhi, Lodha, Mahli, Malar, Mal Paharia, Mirdha, Modi, Munda, Manki, Madgi, Majwar, Nayak/Patnaik,  Nunia, Oraon, Parja, Pradhan, Pashi, Paidi, Panika, Patratanti, Pan, Rajput, Rajwar, Rajwal, Reily, Reddy, Rajbonshi, Rout, Rautia, Santhal, Sonar, Savar, Saora, Tanti, Tantubai, Turi, Tassa, Telenga, Teli.

Languages
Assam Sadri (distinguished from Nagpuri Sadri, often considered a dialect of Bhojpuri),  Odia, Saora, Kurmali, Kurukh, Gondi, Kui, Kharia,  Santhali, and Mundari are spoken among many of them. Assam Sadri is predominantly spoken as first language and serve as lingua franca among them.  The Assam Sadri has several sub-varieties, that arise due to a dominant linguistic group and differ in their phonological, morphological and syntactic features. Whereas Nagpuri Sadri has linguistic features from Bhojpuri, Magahi, etc., the Assam Sadri sub-varieties are influenced by languages that were Indo-Aryan, Dravidian, Austroasiatic, Tibeto-Burman, and Tai-Kradai.  So it is called Assam Sadri or Bagania bhasa. With steady rise in literacy level newer generations are becoming fluent in standard Hindi, Assamese and English.

Education
In July 2021, Kudmali Sahitya Sabha of Assam opposed imposition of Sadri language in primary school for tea-tribes and demand inclusion of Kurmali language in School curriculum. In July 2021, Adivasi Sahitya Sabha of Assam urged Education minister of Assam, Ronuj Pegu to promote Adivasi/ tribal languages such as Santali, Mundari, Kurukh, Kharia and Gondi etc. The president of Adivasi Sahitya Sabha of Assam opposed the use of Sadri or Bagania language in Schools by claiming it as artificial language and opposed the term Tea-tribe by claiming it as self created nomenclature.

Religion

The majority of the population of the community follows Folk Hinduism and Sarnaism while Christianity accounts for about 15% of the population.

Hindus worship different deities during different seasons of a year. Most (if not all) of the Hindus are animistic in nature and worship tribal and Tantra related Gods. The influence of mainstream Vedic Hinduism is minimal and animistic-Shaktism dominates in religious practices.

The ancient tribal religion Sarnaism is also deeply rooted among a sizeable section of tea garden workers. They believe in a universal supreme God and worship him/her in different names like Marangburu, Mahadeo, and Singboga.

Vaishnavism is also steadily gaining footholds among a section of the Hindu population of the community.
 
They are very religious-minded people and love to worship nature. Many trees are considered sacred and are worshipped. Nearly every village has religious temples and sacred ground (jaher than) for community worship.

However increasing conversions into Christianity have led many of them into adopting Christianity and many churches have been built as a result. Nearly one million are now Christians in the state. Kurukh, Santhals, Kharia and Mundas are among the major tribes who have been mostly converted by the Christian missionaries. Catholicism and Protestantism are the major denominations among Adivasi Christians.

Festivals
 
Festivals are an important part of their lives and are generally deeply connected to their religion and their culture. They celebrate many festivals during different seasons. Almost every major Hindu festival is celebrated by the community, with Christians celebrating Christian festivals.

Major festivals celebrated by the community are Fagua, Karam (festival), Jitia, Sohrai, Mage Parab, Baha parab, Tusu Puja, Sarhul, Nawakhani/Nuakhai, Lakhi puja, Manasa Puja, Durga puja, Diwali, Good Friday, Easter and Christmas.

Music and dance
Music is an important component of the community. Their music is usually collectively performed for a variety of occasions like weddings, festivals, the arrival of seasons, ushering-in of new life, and harvests. The community is rich in a variety of music and dances. Through the folk music and dance, they try to convey their perspective on social issues and define their daily lifestyles and their history.

Dhols, Manjiras, Madars, Kartals, Tamaks, Nagaras, Nishans, and Bansuris are some of the musical instruments used by them.

'Jhumair' is a famous folk dance form among the community. This dance is a folk dance prevalent in Jharkhand, Odisha and West Bengal. 
 
It has become famous among the community although traditionally different ethnic groups and tribes have different folk dances. Karam dance is an important dance form that is performed during the Karam festival by boys and girls alike. Other folk dances are   Chhau dance, Sambalpuri Dalkhai dance, Santal, Kurukh dance of Oraon tribe and Kharia dance of Kharia tribe which are performed during different occasions.

Dhols, Mandars, and Kartals are the traditional musical instruments used during the dance for music. Usually, the traditional dress of red-bordered white saris is adorned by female dancers along with jewellery and ornaments before performing the dance. Male dancers wear dhotis and kurtas with white turbans on their heads.

Socio-economic conditions 
They are one of the most backward and exploited communities in Assam due to decades of continuous exploitation by tea estate management and neglect on the part of the government. Though the younger generations are better-educated and are becoming professionals in various fields, there are not many of those in the community.

The literacy rate of the community is one of the lowest in Assam, particularly among girls and women. Due to this, girls are extremely vulnerable to sexual exploitation and early marriages are prevalent among them.

Since the majority of the community are still labourers, they live in labour lines built inside tea-estates and established by tea planters. These estates are located in remote areas and this contributes to the backwardness and exploitation of them by the tea planters. The labourers in a way have to live with the basic facilities provided by the tea planters. The tea planters usually exploit the workers every possible way. Violence and agitation of labourers against the management is common, where the state machinery normally protects the tea-planters. Non-education, poverty, addiction of males to country-beer, poor standard of living, rising population and inadequate health facilities provided to them are the problems in their lives. There are instances when tea-planters do not even supply the life-saving drugs when workers are dying out of epidemics.

The Assam Chah Mazdoor Sangha has been instrumental in improving the lives of tea garden labourers. Reputed Tea Associations, such as Assam Branch Indian Tea Association (ABITA) and Bharatiya Cha Parishad (BCP) have been working with organizations such as UNICEF and the Government of Assam to improve the lives of the tea garden labourers. The ABITA has embarked on a partnership with National Rural Health Mission (NRHM) of the Government of India promoted and partnered by the Government of Assam. This assistance of the Government of Assam for an all-inclusive Medicare system is now available in 105 estates of its membership. The residents of the estates have benefited from the PPP mode as was decided by the Govt. of Assam since 2007. Another unique direction that the ABITA took was its partnership with UNICEF. An intervention which started in 2000 through the Education, Creche Development & Nutrition Programme, later expanded and diversified into a more structured intervention to promote health, nutrition, sanitation and child rights amongst the tea workers population.

 
The tea industry is a crucial part of Indian economy. Assam produces 55% of India's total production of tea. It is a labour-intensive industry and highly dependent on a large workforce. It is the only sector where the majority of the workers are female.

About one million labourers are dependent on Assam's tea industry and almost all of whom are the descendants of those who were brought to Assam as labourers by East India Company, mostly from Jharkhand and Orissa. The sacrifice, toil and hard work of these labourers gave shape to the tea industry of Assam. However, the story behind the tea cultivation, plucking and processing of tea leaves in the plantations is one of exploitation and untold hardships for the tea labourers. These labourers are still living with the basic facilities provided by the tea planters or companies. Poor standard of living and lack of education and health facilities are the main problems of tea labourers.

Literacy level among the community is only 46% one of the lowest against Assam's 72% overall literacy rate as tea garden management and other vested interests hinder in their educational development.

Government of Assam has a full fledged "Tea-tribes welfare department" for looking after the socio-economic welfare of the community. There also exist "Adivasi Development Council" and "Tea & ex-Tea garden tribes Development council" to look after specific development needs of the community.
But Adivasi students organisation AASAA has demanded extension of area of "Adivasi development council" in all part of Assam as it is currently operational in only sixth scheduled areas of the state.

There also has been demand for formulation of Autonomous satellite council for Adivasis in Assam.

Demand of Scheduled Tribe status
Tribals among the community have been fighting for decades to receive Scheduled Tribe (ST) status, which is being denied to them in Assam although in other states of India their counterparts fully enjoy that status.
The community is composed of many large tribes like Munda, Santhal, Kurukh (Oraon), Gonds, Bhumij and dozen others who are being denied Scheduled Tribe status. These tribal call themselves "Adivasi".
Assam is the only state in India where these tribal have been denied ST status. This has given rise to identity politics among these people and different political parties are banking on this issue to get votes for decades during elections. Now some of the tribes have started to demand ST status separately in order to fulfill the Constitutional criteria designating "Scheduled Tribe".

According to S.D. Pando, one of the three members of a panel set up by the Assam government to write an ethnographic report on the community, Among the 96 ethnic groups who are officially listed as 'Tea-tribes'  in Assam, nearly 40 are recognised as "Tribals" or Scheduled Tribes (ST) in other parts of India while the "non-tribals" among the Tea-garden community distributed in 50 groups are categorized as Scheduled castes (SC) and Other Backward classes (OBC) in states outside Assam like Jharkhand and Odisha. The population of these 50 "non-tribals" ethnic groups is less than two lakhs(200,000) according to government estimates compared to the substantially higher population of the 40 "tribal" groups.

Numerous agitations and movements have been organised and are ongoing demanding ST status  and most infamous of them was the Beltola incident of Guwahati happened on 24 November 2007 where public rape and killings occurred in the daylight which had rocked India particularly Assam.

On 8 January 2019 central government led by Bharatiya Janata Party approved The Constitution (Scheduled Tribes) Order (Amendment) Bill 2019 in Cabinet to accord "Scheduled Tribe" status to at least 36 tribes of this community and tabled it in Parliament. The bill passed in the Lok Sabha but failed to make it through Rajya Sabha on the last day of the Budget session due to lack of time.

Increase in wage issue
The issue of wage is another issue gripping the majority members of this community. They are demanding an increase in daily wages of tea garden workers of the state from the existing daily wage of ₹167 ($2.1) to ₹350 ($5).

As cited, ₹167 as a daily wage for tea garden workers did not fulfill the provisions of the Minimum Wage Act, 1948, as it is below the Assam government's prescribed minimum wage for organized workers  (₹290). Wages in tea gardens of Barak Valley is even more meagre (₹115 per day). And also according to the Plantation Labour Act, 1951, and the Minimum Wage Act, 1948, costs associated with housing, medical and electricity could not be included as part of minimum wages.

Southern states of India have been successful in increasing the daily wages of tea garden workers while maintaining the Industry profitable. The daily wage is ₹310 ($5) in Kerala.

It is estimated that 10 lakhs (1 million) labourers including casual workers working in over 850 tea gardens are deprived of their right of minimum wages in Assam.

Though recently in 2018 the wages of tea garden workers have improved considerably to ₹167 by Government of Assam it is still well below the ₹350 as demanded by the workers. The wages of tea garden labourers are revised every few years through agreements between the Consultative Committee of Plantation Associations (CCPA) and the Assam Chah Mazdoor Sangha (ACMS). Tea Garden labourers of the Brahmaputra Valley in Assam get ₹167 as daily wage, but including statutory and non-statutory benefits and other benefits, their daily wage is around ₹214 per day. They also get housing facilities from the tea garden management and avail free medical benefits.

Human Rights issue
The persecution of the community is mainly political and ethnic in nature. They are increasingly becoming the victims of a volatile social and political situation in Assam. The violence upon the community has risen following the rise of ethnic nationalism and related militancy across the state and violent arising out of border disputes of Assam with other states. There were two ethnic clashes between Bodo and Adivasi during the 1990s at the height of  Bodoland statehood movement when National Democratic Front of Boroland (NDFB) militants initiated ethnic cleansings against Adivasi population in Kokrajhar. Hundreds of people from both communities were the victim of those ethnic clashes. Thousands of people were made homeless in the clashes of 1996 and 1998. Most of the time both the communities live in harmony without any discrimination in the BTAD area with frequent intermarriage and other social relations. But the armed conflict between NDFB – Indian Army and NDFB – Adivasi Cobra Force makes the Adivasi community vulnerable to frequent violent attacks from NDFB militants.
 
A tripartite Adivasi Peace Accord has been signed between Central Ministry of Home Affairs, Government of Assam and 8 armed cease fire Adivasi rebel groups on 15 September 2022 which guaranteed formation of "Adivasi Welfare and Development Council" having headquarter at Guwahati along with a Special development package of Rs.1000 crores for socio-economic and educational upliftment of Adivasi communities with focused infrastructure development in Adivasi inhabiting villages/tea gardens of Assam.

 8 Adivasi students lost their lives in police firing at Paneri in Udalguri district on 25 July 2003 when they were blocking the national highway during the 12 hour Assam Bandh by All Adivasi Students Association of Assam (AASAA) demanding Scheduled Tribes(ST) status.
 In November 2007, five individuals lost their lives and at least 250 injured when a rally in demand of Scheduled Tribe status by All Adivasi Students Association of Assam (AASAA) turned violent between the participants and locals in Guwahati, the state capital of Assam. A teenage tribal girl and a woman was molested in the daylight during the violence.
 Many living in the border areas of Sonitpur, and Lakhimpur districts have lost their lives during violence arising out of Assam-Arunachal Pradesh border dispute from 1992 to 2014 due to attacks by armed miscreants from the Arunachal Pradesh side.
 In October–November 2010, thousands of Tribals, including women and children, were forcefully evicted by Forest Department of Assam without prior notice from the Lungsung forest area under Haltugaon Forest division in Kokrajhar district of Assam due to illegal encroachment of forest lands. The Forest department burnt down hundreds of houses in 59 villages in the Lungsung forest area during the eviction drive and perpetrated various atrocities on the Adivasi villagers mostly Santhals and Oraons. About 1200 to 1400 families comprising over 7000 persons were rendered homeless.
 In August 2014, at least 10 Tribal villagers lost their lives and several injured near Uriamghat and Morangi in the district of Golaghat due to alleged attacks by armed Naga miscreants supported by NSCN militants. At least 10,000 people were displaced mostly Adivasis following the attacks in Morangi, Golaghat district. Border dispute between Assam and Nagaland is cited as one of the reasons for the attack.
 On December 2014 Assam violence many innocent Adivasi villagers lost lives to militant attacks by NDFB(S). It all started on 21 December 2014, when Two NDFB(S) cadre were killed in an encounter with security personnel. In retaliation, On 23 December 2014,  65 Tribal Adivasi villagers lost their lives in the simultaneous attacks by NDFB(S)  militants armed with AK 47/56 series weapons in the three districts of Sonitpur, Kokrajhar and Chirang in one of the worst massacre in the history of Northeast India. Among the dead were 18 children and 21 women. In retaliation, the Adivasis killed three Bodos in a village near Behali in Sonitpur district and set fire on houses of Bodos in Phuloguri village. Further, during the clash, another 14 were killed. The total death toll reached 85. Both communities burned houses and damaged properties at different parts of the state. The violence also spread to Udalguri district. Nearly 0.3 million people from both Adivasi and Bodo community got internally displaced due to retaliatory violence after the attacks. It led to widespread public protests across different parts of Assam in which again three tribal Adivasi protesters lost their lives in police firing in Dhekiajuli. Widespread condemnation happened across the nation against the massacre. As a result, Indian Army launched "Operation All Out" to hunt down the NDFB(S) militants.
 At least 168 people mostly tea workers including women lost life in 2019 Assam alcohol poisonings one of the worst hooch tragedies of India in the districts of Jorhat and Golaghat on 21–25 February 2019.

Notes
1.^ "The Tea Labourers Of North East India: An Anthropo-historical perspective".

References

Bibliography

External links

Village Planning has lifesaving impact for the Tea Tribes in Assam
Tribal Turmoil (Including a history of exploitation)
Tea Tribes are lagging behind in the Process of Urbanization : A Study on Selected Tea Gardens of Jorhat District, Assam
PATHETIC PLIGHT OF THE TEA TRIBES IN COLONIAL ASSAM (1826-1947A.D): A BRIEF STUDY 

Ethnic groups in India
Tribes of Assam
Social groups of Assam
Tea industry in Assam